Friendship is a relationship of mutual affection between people. It is a stronger form of interpersonal bond than an "acquaintance" or an "association", such as a classmate, neighbor, coworker, or colleague.

In some cultures, the concept of friendship is restricted to a small number of very deep relationships; in others, such as the U.S. and Canada, a person could have many friends, and perhaps a more intense relationship with one or two people, who may be called good friends or best friends. Other colloquial terms include besties or Best Friends Forever (BFFs). Although there are many forms of friendship, some of which may vary from place to place, certain characteristics are present in many such bonds. Such features include choosing to be with one another, enjoying time spent together, and being able to engage in a positive and supportive role to one another.

Sometimes friends are distinguished from family, as in the saying "friends and family", and sometimes from lovers (e.g., "lovers and friends"), although the line is blurred with friends with benefits. Similarly, the friend zone is a term for when someone is restricted from rising up to the status of lover, hence the name (see also Unrequited love).

Friendship has been studied in academic fields, such as communication, sociology, social psychology, anthropology, and philosophy. Various academic theories of friendship have been proposed, including social exchange theory, equity theory, relational dialectics, and attachment styles.

Developmental psychology

Childhood

The understanding of friendship in children tends to be more heavily focused on areas such as common activities, physical proximity, and shared expectations. These friendships provide opportunity for playing and practicing self-regulation. Most children tend to describe friendship in terms of things like sharing, and children are more likely to share with someone they consider to be a friend. As children mature, they become less individualized and are more aware of others. They gain the ability to empathize with their friends, and enjoy playing in groups. They also experience peer rejection as they move through the middle childhood years. Establishing good friendships at a young age helps a child to be better acclimated in society later on in their life.

Based upon the reports of teachers and mothers, 75% of preschool children had at least one friend. This figure rose to 78% through the fifth grade, as measured by co-nomination as friends, and 55% had a mutual best friend. About 15% of children were found to be chronically friendless, reporting periods without mutual friends at least six months.

Studies have shown that friendships in childhood can assist in the development of certain skills, such as building empathy and learning different problem solving techniques.
Coaching from parents can be useful in helping children to make friends. Eileen Kennedy-Moore describes three key ingredients of children's friendship formation: (1) openness, (2) similarity, and (3) shared fun. Parents can also help children understand social guidelines they haven't learned on their own. Drawing from research by Robert Selman and others, Kennedy-Moore outlines developmental stages in children's friendship, reflecting an increasing capacity to understand others' perspectives: "I Want It My Way", "What's In It For Me?", "By the Rules", "Caring and Sharing", and "Friends Through Thick and Thin."

Adolescence

In adolescence, friendships become "more giving, sharing, frank, supportive, and spontaneous." Adolescents tend to seek out peers who can provide such qualities in a reciprocal relationship, and to avoid peers whose problematic behavior suggest they may not be able to satisfy these needs. Personal characteristics and dispositions are also features sought by adolescents, when choosing whom to begin a friendship with. During adolescence, friendship relationships are more based on similar morals and values, loyalty, and shared interests than that of children, in which friendships stem from being in the same vicinity and access to playthings.

One large study of American adolescents determined how their engagement in problematic behavior (such as stealing, fighting, and truancy) was related to their friendships. Findings indicated that adolescents were less likely to engage in problem behavior when their friends did well in school, participated in school activities, avoided drinking, and had good mental health. The opposite was found regarding adolescents who did engage in problematic behavior. Whether adolescents were influenced by their friends to engage in problem behavior depended on how much they were exposed to those friends, and whether they and their friendship groups "fit in" at school.

Friendships formed during post-secondary education last longer than friendships formed earlier. In late adolescence, cross-racial friendships tend to be uncommon, likely due to prejudice and cultural differences.

Adulthood

Friendship in adulthood provides companionship, affection, as well as emotional support, and contributes positively to mental well-being and improved physical health.

Adults may find it particularly difficult to maintain meaningful friendships in the workplace. "The workplace can crackle with competition, so people learn to hide vulnerabilities and quirks from colleagues. Work friendships often take on a transactional feel; it is difficult to say where networking ends and real friendship begins." Unlike younger people, many adults value their financial well-being and security that their job provides rather than developing friendships with coworkers.

The majority of adults have an average of two close friends. Numerous studies with adults suggest that friendships and other supportive relationships do enhance self-esteem.

Older adults
Older adults continue to report high levels of personal satisfaction in their friendships as they age, even as the overall number of friends tends to decline. This satisfaction is associated with an increased ability to accomplish activities of daily living, as well as a reduced decline in cognitive abilities, decreased instances of hospitalization, and better outcomes related to rehabilitation. The overall number of reported friends in later life may be mediated by increased lucidity, better speech and vision, and marital status. A decline in the number of friends an individual has as they become older has been explained by Carstensen's Socioemotional Selectivity Theory, which describes a change in motivation that adults experience when socializing. The theory states that an increase in age is characterized by a shift from information-gathering to emotional regulation; in order to maintain positive emotions, older adults restrict their social groups to those whom they share an emotional bond.

As one review phrased it:

Research within the past four decades has now consistently found that older adults reporting the highest levels of happiness and general well being also report strong, close ties to numerous friends.

As family responsibilities and vocational pressures lessen, friendships become more important. Among the elderly, friendships can provide links to the larger community, serve as a protective factor against depression and loneliness, and compensate for potential losses in social support previously given by family members. Especially for people who cannot go out as often, interactions with friends allow for continued societal interaction. Additionally, older adults in declining health who remain in contact with friends show improved psychological well-being.

Forming and maintaining
Friendships are foremost formed by choice, typically on the basis that the parties involved admire each other on an intimate level, enjoying aspects such as commonality and socializing.

Some factors affect most people. For example, most people underestimate how much other people like them. The liking gap can make it difficult to form friendships.

Developmental issues 
People with certain types of developmental disorders may struggle more than usual to make and maintain friendships, especially children with attention deficit hyperactivity disorder (ADHD), autism spectrum disorders, or children with Down syndrome.

Health
Studies have found that strong social supports improve a person's prospects for good health and longevity. Conversely, loneliness and a lack of social supports have been linked to an increased risk of heart disease, viral infections, and cancer, as well as higher mortality rates overall. Two researchers have even termed friendship networks a "behavioral vaccine" that boosts both physical and mental health.

There is a large body of research linking friendship and health, but the precise reasons for the connection remain unclear. Most of the studies in this area are large prospective studies that follow people over time, and while there may be a correlation between the two variables (friendship and health status), researchers still do not know if there is a cause and effect relationship, such as the notion that good friendships actually improve health. A number of theories have attempted to explain this link. These theories have included that good friends encourage their friends to lead more healthy lifestyles; that good friends encourage their friends to seek help and access services when needed; that good friends enhance their friends' coping skills in dealing with illness and other health problems; and that good friends actually affect physiological pathways that are protective of health.

Mental health
The lack of friendship has been found to play a role in increasing risk of suicidal ideation among female adolescents, including having more friends who were not themselves friends with one another. However, no similar effect was observed for males. Having few or no friends is a major indicator in the diagnosis of a range of mental disorders.

Higher friendship quality directly contributes to self-esteem, self-confidence, and social development. A World Happiness Database study found that people with close friendships are happier, although the absolute number of friends did not increase happiness. Other studies have suggested that children who have friendships of a high quality may be protected against the development of certain disorders, such as anxiety and depression. Conversely, having few friends is associated with dropping out of school, as well as aggression, adult crime, and loneliness. Peer rejection is also associated with lower later aspiration in the workforce, and participation in social activities, while higher levels of friendship was associated with higher adult self-esteem.

Dissolution
The dissolution of a friendship may be viewed as a personal rejection, or may be the result of natural changes over time, as friends grow more distant both physically and emotionally. The disruption of friendships has been associated with increased guilt, anger and depression, and may be highly stressful events, especially in childhood. However, potential negative effects can be mitigated if the dissolution of a friendship is replaced with another close relationship.

Demographics
Friends tend to be more similar to one another in terms of age, gender, behavior, substance abuse, personal disposition, and academic performance. In ethnically diverse countries, there is broad evidence that children and adolescents tend to form friendships with others of the same race or ethnicity, beginning in preschool, and peaking in middle or late childhood. As a result of social separation and confinement of the sexes, friendships between men and women have little presence in recorded history, having only become a widely accepted occurrence in the 20th century.

Gender differences 

In general, female-female friendship interactions among children mostly tend to focus on interpersonal connections and mutual support. In contrast, male-male interaction tends to be more focused on social status. As a result, they may actively discourage the expression of emotional needs.

Females report more anxiety, jealousy, and relational victimization and less stability related to their friendships. Males, on the other hand, report higher levels of physical victimization. Nevertheless, males and females tend to report relative satisfaction levels with their friendships.

Women tend to be more expressive and intimate in their same-sex friendships and have a smaller range of friends. Males are more likely to define intimacy in terms of shared physical experiences. In contrast, females are more likely to define it in shared emotional ones. Males are less likely to make emotional or personal disclosures to other males because they could use this information against them. However, they will disclose this information to females (as they are not in competition with them), and males tend to regard friendships with females as more meaningful, intimate, and pleasant. Male-male friendships are generally more like alliances, while female-female friendships are much more attachment-based. As a result, this also means that the end of male-male friendships tends to be less emotionally upsetting than that of female-female friendships.

Women tend to be more socially adept than their male peers among older adults. As a result, many older men may rely upon a female companion, such as a spouse, to compensate for their comparative lack of social skills. One study found that women in Europe and North America were slightly more likely than men to self-report having a best friend.

Culture 
Which relationships count as true friendships, rather than as an acquaintance or a co-worker, varies by culture. In English-speaking cultures, it is not unusual for people to include weaker relationships as being friends.  In other cultures, such as the Russian and Polish cultures, only the most significant relationships are considered friends.  A Russian might have one or two friends plus a large number of "pals" or acquaintances; a Canadian in similar circumstances might count all of these relationships as being friends.

In Western cultures, friendships are often seen as lesser to familial or romantic. In practice, friendships in Ancient Greece were more utilitarian than affectionate, being based upon obligation and reliance, though they held a broad view on the variance of friendship. Aristotle wrote of there being three kinds of friendships: those in recognition of pleasure, those in recognition of advantage, and those in recognition of virtue. 

When discussing taboos of friendship it was found that Chinese respondents found more than their British counterparts.

Interspecies

Friendship is found among animals of higher intelligence, such as higher mammals and some birds. Cross-species friendships are common between humans and domestic animals, such as a pet snake. Cross-species friendships may also occur between two non-human animals, such as dogs and cats.

See also

 Blood brother
 Boston marriage
 Bromance
 Casual relationship
 Cross-sex friendships
 Female bonding
 Fraternization
 Frenemy
 Friend of a friend
 Friendship Day
 Imaginary friend
 Intimate relationship
 Kalyāṇa-mittatā (spiritual friendship)
 Male bonding
 Nicomachean Ethics, Books VIII and IX: Friendship and partnership
 Platonic love
 Romantic friendship
 Social connection
 Theorem on friends and strangers
 Womance

Notes

References

Further reading
 
 
 
 Brian Hare and Vanessa Woods, "Survival of the Friendliest: Natural selection for hypersocial traits enabled Earth's apex species to best Neandertals and other competitors", Scientific American, vol. 323, no. 2 (August 2020), pp. 58–63.

External links

 
 BBC Radio 4 series "In Our Time", on Friendship, 2 March 2006
 Friendship at the Stanford Encyclopedia of Philosophy

 
Kindness
Virtue
Philosophy of love
Group processes
Human activities